Deva is a 2002 Indian Bengali film directed by Sujit Guha and produced by  Udhayanidhi Stalin under the banner of  Red Giant Movies and Silver Vally Communications Ltd.The film features actors Prosenjit Chatterjee and Arpita Pal in the lead roles. Music of the film has been composed by Bappi Lahiri. The film was a remake of Tamil film Dheena (2001).

Plot
Deva works for his brother, a gangster, and is very close to him. However, things turn sour between them after a misunderstanding leads to the death of their sister.

Cast 
 Prosenjit Chatterjee as Dibakar Chowdhury aka Deva
 Arpita Pal as Neela, Deva's love interest
 Victor Banerjee as Prabhakar Chowdhury, Deva's elder brother and Don of Kolkata
 Laboni Sarkar as Gauri Chowdhury, Deva's sister-in-law
 Kharaj Mukherjee as Deva's friend
 Arun Banerjee as MLA Madhu Dutta
 Kushal Chakraborty as Ashok, Neela's elder brother
 Sucheta Chakraborty as Seema, Deva's sister

Soundtrack

References 

Bengali-language Indian films
Bengali remakes of Tamil films
2002 films
2000s Bengali-language films